Dhamoirhat is an upazila of Naogaon District in the Division of Rajshahi, Bangladesh. The main river of the Dhamoirhat Upazila is the Atrai.

History
During the War of Liberation, the Pak army had camped at places like Farsipara, Pagla Dewan, Rangamati, etc. A direct encounter between the Pak army and the freedom fighters were held at Piral Danga, Gangra, Kulfatpur and Rangamati with the heavy casualty on both sides. The Pak army burnt and sacked the village Kulfatpur and killed 14 innocent villagers. Marks of War of Liberation Mass grave: 2 (Farsipara, Pagla Dewan).

Geography

It has 29661 households and total area 300.8 km2.

Dhamoirhat Upazila is bounded by Balurghat and Tapan CD Blocks in Dakshin Dinajpur district, West Bengal, India, on the north, Joypurhat Sadar Upazila on the east, Badalgachhi and Patnitala Upazilas on the south and Patnitala Upazila on the west.

Climate
Dhamoirhat is placed in a monsoon area. In the summer, temp. is about 40 degree & in the rainy season(June–July) raindrops as well.

Demographics
At the 2011 Bangladesh census, Dhamoirhat had a population of 184778. Males constituted 51.73% of the population, and females 48.27%; Muslim 89.81%, Hindus 6.92%, Christians 1.71%, and tribals 1.56%.The tribal people are almost exclusively Santals. Dhamoirhat had an average literacy rate of 50.1% (7+ years), against the national average of 72.9% literate.

Main occupations is Agriculture 51.65%, agricultural labourer 33.01%, wage labourer 1.99%, service 2.63%, commerce 4.76%, others 5.96%.Land use  Total cultivable land 42425 hectares, fallow land 390 hectares; single crop 39%, double crop 37% and treble crop land 24%. Land under irrigation 42%.
Land control Among the peasants 12% are rich, 23% medium, 22% marginal, 24% landless, and 19% small; cultivable land per head 0.28 hectare.
Value of land The market of value of land of first grade is Tk 5000 per 0.01 hectare.
Main crops Paddy, wheat, jute, brinjal, potato, mustard seed, pulse, onion, garlic, tamarind, til, carrot, cauliflower.
Extinct or nearly crops Local variety of paddy, kaun, linseed, pulse, jab, bajra.

Main fruits: Mango, blackberry, jackfruit, banana, litchi, papaya, guava, and watermelon.

Dairies, poultry and fisheries: Dairy 3, poultry 33, fishery 21, hatchery1.

Communications facilities: Roads- Pucca 70 km, mud road 322 km.
Traditional transport Palanquin, dhuli, horse carriage, bullock cart. These means of transport are nearly extinct.

Manufactures: Biscuit factory 6, ice factory 6.

Cottage industries: Bamboo work 42, potteries 60, sewing machine 305, welding work 32, iron smith 12, Goldsmith 25.
Hat, bazar and fairs. The total number of hats and bazar 25; fairs 9, most noted of which is Madarer Mela at Sankarpur.
Main exports Banana, brinjal, tamarind, watermelon.

Health centres: Upazila health complex 1, Christian mission hospital 1, satellite clinic 3, family welfare centres 5.

Points of interest

 Jagaddala Mahavihara
 The extraordinary long tomb of Muhammad Shiran Khilji, the second Muslim ruler of Bengal, located in Mahisantosh.
 Altadighi National Park
 Vimer Panti
 Mahishontosh Mazar
 Agrapuri Vihara (Agradigun Dhibi)
 Pagla Dewan Mazar

Administration
Dhamoirhat, now an upazila, was established in 1922.

Dhamoirhat Upazila is divided into Dhamoirhat Municipality and eight union parishads: Agradigun, Alampur, Aranagar, Dhamoirhat, Isabpur, Jahanpur, Khelna, and Omar. The union parishads are subdivided into 212 mauzas and 243 villages.
 Mayor of Municipality: Md. Aminul Islam
 Chairman of Upazila council: Azar Uddin
 Vice chairman of Upazila council: Md. Sohel Rana
 Female Vice Chairman of Upazila council: Mrs. Farah Diba

Education
The average literacy rate of Dhamoirhat Upazila is 28.4%; where male includes 34% & female 22.2%.

Educational Institutions:
College 11, High School 29, Madrasa (Non-Govt ) 37, Government primary school 64, Non-Government primary school 29, Satellite school 4, Kindergarten 1, Mission school 1, Vocational institutions 1, orphanage 4.

College
 Dhamoirhat M. M. Government College
 Dhamoirhat Mohila College
 Shohid Zia Technical College
 Alhaz Zahangir Alam Memorial College
 Jogdal Adibasi School & College
 Poranagar Model College
Agradigun College

Schools and madrasas
 Chalkmoiram Govt. Model High School 
 Jahanpur Govt. Primary School
 Shankarpur High School
 Lakshmanpara High School
 Chalkmoiram Govt. Primary School.
 Raghunathpur Kamil Madrasah
 Pagol Dewan Siddiquea Fazil Madrasah
 Durgapur-Basudebpur Alim Madrasha
 Chandipur High School
 Chandipur Govt. Primary School
 Arnagar Bi-Lateral high School
 Aranagar Primary School
 Rangamati High School
 Rangamati Primary School
 Rangamati Hi -Ul-Ulom Hafijia Madrasa & Orphanage
 Varom High School
 Varom Primary School
 Isabpur High School
 Dhamoirhat Girls School
 Agradigun High School
 Agradigun Girls High School
 Moheshpur Primary School
 Dhamoirhat Shofia High School
 Bostabor Dakhil Madrasah
 Dhamoirhat Fazil Degree Madrasha

Notable people 
Muzaffar Rahman Chowdhury, former Member of the National Assembly of Pakistan
Shahiduzzaman Sarker (b. 1955), former Whip of Treasury Bench of the Government of Bangladesh
Muhammad Shiran Khalji (d. 1208), second Governor of Bengal

See also
 Upazilas of Bangladesh
 Districts of Bangladesh
 Divisions of Bangladesh

References

Dhamoirhat Upazila